Ar de Rock (literally Air of Rock, meaning "a rock look/appearance"; a pun on hard rock) is the debut album by Portuguese musician Rui Veloso, released in July 1980 by EMI-Valentim de Carvalho. 

The album, produced by António Pinho, contains eleven songs. The songs "Chico Fininho" and "Rapariguinha do Shopping" were released as singles.

Ar de Rock was commercially successful in Portugal immediately after its release and is retrospectively considered a landmark album of Portuguese pop-rock music. Its success is considered to have triggered the so-called "boom of Portuguese rock" in the 1980s.

Recording
The album was recorded in one week and mixed in three days at RPE Studios, in Lisbon, in 1980.

Reception and legacy 
Ar de Rock and the single "Chico Fininho" became an immediate success in Portugal. Their success is considered to have triggered in Portugal what critics call the "boom of Portuguese rock" and a wave of pop-rock hits sung in Portuguese, during the 1980s. It also earned Veloso the nickname "father of Portuguese rock".

Francisco Vasconcelos, executive manager at Valentim de Carvalho in the 1980s, said that "with Rui Veloso the politics went out and the social side entered the Portuguese pop music. With Rui Veloso we stopped listening and started feeling and dancing the music made in Portugal. The success of Ar de Rock happened because, in 1980, Portugal was a country that desperately wanted to change."

In 2000, a tribute album named 20 anos depois - Ar de Rock was released, containing covers from various notable Portuguese artists. 

In 2009, Portuguese music magazine Blitz named Ar de Rock as the greatest Portuguese album of the 1980s, in a list ranking the greatest Portuguese albums of the past four decades.

Track listing

Personnel
Rui Veloso – electric and acoustic guitar, electric piano, blues harp and vocals
Zé Nabo – bass guitar
Ramon Galarza – drums and percussion

Charts

References

External links
Ar de Rock at moo.pt 

1980 debut albums
Rui Veloso albums